Lifestories: Families in Crisis is an American after school special drama television series that premiered on HBO on August 1, 1992.

The show
Lifestories: Families in Crisis deals with major issues involving individuals, mostly teenagers and young adults. The stories usually ended with the real person on which the story is based providing helpful information for others in a similar situation. Issues include a child molesting priest (played by Craig Wasson) terrorizing families, a college student with bulimia (played by Calista Flockhart) trying to deal with her problems, a football player addicted to steroids (played by Ben Affleck), substance abuse by a teenager, homosexuality and bi-sexuality involving teenagers, a teenage girl (Dina Spybey, in a Daytime Emmy Award-winning performance as Becky Bell) who has an illegal abortion and dies, a young man (played by Sam Rockwell) who is ultimately convicted of vehicular homicide after crashing into a young woman's (played by Jorja Fox) car while drunk, a boy (Adam LaVorgna as Joey DiPaolo) who contracts HIV and has to live with the disease, homelessness in Philadelphia and the major impact it has on a teenager (Ward Saxton as Trevor Ferrell) and the depression and suicide of one popular athletic teenager and its lasting effect on his best friend.

Episodes

References

External links
 

1992 American television series debuts
1996 American television series endings
1990s American teen drama television series
English-language television shows
HBO original programming
Television series about teenagers